Ivan Merz (16 December 1896 – 10 May 1928) was a Croatian lay academic, beatified by Pope John Paul II on a visit at Banja Luka, Bosnia and Herzegovina on June 22, 2003.  Ivan Merz promoted the liturgical movement in Croatia and together with Ivo Protulipac created a movement for the young people, “The Croatian union of the Eagles” (“Hrvatski orlovski savez)”, inspired by the “Eucharistic Crusade,” which he had encountered in France.

Legacy in the Philippines
The Director of the Confraternity, Dave Ceasar Dela Cruz was elected as the Vice Postulator of the Cause for the Canonization of Blessed Ivan Merz  on 19 March 2008 by the Vatican through the Congregation for the Causes of Saints.

See also

References

1896 births
1928 deaths
People from Banja Luka
Croatian Jews
Austro-Hungarian Jews
Croatian Austro-Hungarians
Croats of Bosnia and Herzegovina
Croatian Roman Catholics
Croatian beatified people
Catholic Church in Croatia
Roman Catholic activists
Roman Catholic Diocese of Banja Luka
Catholic philosophers
20th-century venerated Christians
Croatian people of Bosnia and Herzegovina-Jewish descent
Beatifications by Pope John Paul II
Venerated Catholics by Pope John Paul II
Bosnia and Herzegovina Jews

tw:Ivan Merz